Land of the Open Range is a 1942 Western film. It uses out takes from Cimarron (1931).

Summary
Luke Archer's will stipulates that his huge land holding will be open for filing, but only to ex-convicts who served at least two years in prison. This brings a large criminal element to town but the real crooks are Archer's Lawyer Carse and his henchmen. Dave and his deputies are aided by ex-safecracker Pinky who uses his skills to learn of Carse's plan.

Plot
A deputy sheriff faces a town of ex-cons.

Production
It was based on a magazine article "Homesteads of Hate".

Filming started August 1941.

References

External links
 

1942 films
1942 Western (genre) films
Films directed by Edward Killy
Films produced by Bert Gilroy
RKO Pictures films
American Western (genre) films
American black-and-white films
1940s American films